Kleppe or Klepp can refer to:

People
 Johan Kleppe (born 1928), Norwegian veterinarian and politician for the Liberal Party
 Karl K. Kleppe (1877–1959), Norwegian farmer and politician for the Liberal Party
 Per Kleppe (born 1923), Norwegian economist and politician for the Labour Party
 Thomas S. Kleppe (1919–2007), US politician who served as the Representative from North Dakota
 Vidar Kleppe (born 1963), Member of Parliament in Norway and deputy leader of the Progress Party

Places
 Klepp, a municipality in Rogaland county, Norway
 Kleppe, a village in the municipality of Klepp in Rogaland county, Norway
 Klepp Church, a church in the village of Kleppe
 Klepp stasjon, a village in the municipality of Klepp in Rogaland county, Norway
 Klepp Station, a railway station in the municipality of Klepp in Rogaland county, Norway
 Kleppe (Orpe), a river of North Rhine-Westphalia and of Hesse, Germany, tributary of the Orpe

Other
 Klepp I Runestone, a runestone found in Klepp, Norway
 Kleppe v. New Mexico, a 1976 decision of the U.S. Supreme Court
 Klepp IL, a sports club in the municipality of Klepp in Rogaland county, Norway